This list of works by Renzo Piano categorizes the work of the Pritzker Prize-winning architect. The following are some of his major constructions:

Completed
 IRCAM & the Centre Georges Pompidou, Paris, France (1971–77)
 IBM Travelling Pavilion, (1982–84)
 Banca CIS building, Cagliari, Sardinia, Italy (1985)
 Menil Collection, Houston, Texas, United States (1982–87)
 Stadio San Nicola, Bari, Italy (1988–89)
 Porto Antico, Aquarium of Genoa, Genoa, Italy (1992)
 International Terminal, Kansai International Airport, Osaka, Japan (1991–94)
 Cy Twombly Gallery, Houston, Texas, United States (1995)
 NEMO science museum, Amsterdam, Netherlands (1997)
 Beyeler Foundation Museum, Basel, Switzerland (1991–97)
 Ushibukahaiyao Bridge, Shimoshima Island, Amakusa, Japan (1991–97)
 Jean-Marie Tjibaou Cultural Center, Nouméa, New Caledonia, France (1991–98)
 Ferrari wind tunnel, Maranello, Italy (1996–98)
 Potsdamer Platz master plan, Berlin, Germany (1992–2000)
 Aurora Place, Sydney, Australia (1996–2000)
 Auditorium Paganini, Parma, Italy (2001)
 Maison Hermès, Tokyo, Japan (2001)
 Parco della Musica, Rome, Italy (2002)
 Nasher Sculpture Center, Dallas, Texas, United States (1999–2003)
 Il Sole 24 Ore headquarters, Milan, Italy (1998–2004)
 Padre Pio Pilgrimage Church, San Giovanni Rotondo, Italy (2004)
 Weltstadthaus, Cologne, Germany (2005)
 High Museum of Art Expansion, Atlanta, United States (2005)
 Zentrum Paul Klee, Bern, Switzerland (1999–2005)
 Cité Internationale, Lyon, France (1995–06)
 The Morgan Library & Museum expansion, New York City, United States (2003–06)
 Rocca di Frassinello Winery, Gavorrano, Italy (2002–07) (artistic direction: Massimo Alvisi)
 The New York Times Building, New York City, United States (2003–07)
 Vulcano Buono, Nola, Italy (2007)
 California Academy of Sciences rebuilding, San Francisco, United States (2008)
 Nichols Bridgeway, Chicago, United States (2009)
 Modern Wing expansion of the Art Institute of Chicago, Chicago, United States (2009)
 Central Saint Giles, London, United Kingdom (2010)
 The Shard, London, United Kingdom (2000–12)
 Astrup Fearnley Museum of Modern Art, Tjuvholmen, Oslo, Norway (2002–12)
 Isabella Stewart Gardner Museum wing, Boston, United States(2005–12)
 Kimbell Art Museum expansion, Fort Worth, Texas, United States (2008–13)
 Museo delle Scienze, Trento, Italy (2007–13)
 Harvard Art Museums expansion and renovation, Cambridge, Massachusetts, United States (2009–14)
 Pathé Foundation headquarters, Paris, France (2006–14)
 Grattacielo Intesa Sanpaolo, Turin, Italy (2011–14)
 KT Corporation headquarters, Seoul, South Korea (2011–15)
 City Gate, Royal Opera House, Parliament House and Ditch, Valletta, Malta (2009–15)
 Whitney Museum of American Art, New York City, United States (2005–15)
 Stavros Niarchos Foundation Cultural Center, Athens, Greece (2008–16)
 Centro de Arte Botín, Santander, Spain (2011–17)
 City Center Bishop Ranch, San Ramon, California, United States (2014–18) 
 Genoa-Saint George Bridge, Genoa, Italy (2018–20)

Current
 Los Angeles County Museum of Art, Los Angeles, United States (2003–)
 Sesto San Giovanni masterplan, Milan, Italy (2004–)
 Columbia University Manhattanville Campus Master Plan and Jerome L. Greene Science Center, New York City, United States (2004–)
 Renzo Piano Tower I & II, San Francisco, United States (2006–)
 ARS AEVI Museum of Contemporary Art in Sarajevo, Bosnia and Herzegovina (1999–)
 The Academy Museum of Motion Pictures, Los Angeles, United States (2012–present)
 One Sydney Harbour, Sydney, Australia
 Krause Gateway Center / Kum & Go Corporate Headquarters, Des Moines, Iowa

Cancelled
 City Tech Tower, New York City, United States
 Trans National Place, Boston, United States

References

External links
Renzo Piano Building Workshop Official Website

 List
Piano, Renzo